Toy Golf is a golfing game released in 2005 for the Gizmondo and Windows systems.

In Toy Golf you control a golf ball that you have to navigate through a bedroom, maneuvering around household objects. The goal is to get the golf ball into a hole at the end of the stage.

2005 video games
Gizmondo games
Miniature golf video games
Video games about toys
Video games developed in Finland
Windows games
Multiplayer and single-player video games